The Vice-President of the Criminal Division is a Lord Justice of Appeal who assists the Lord Chief Justice, the President of the Criminal Division of the Court of Appeal of England and Wales. The post was created by Lord Bingham of Cornhill during his tenure as Lord Chief Justice. He appointed Sir Christopher Rose to take up some of the burden of his duties with respect to the Criminal Division, while appointing Sir Paul Kennedy Vice-President of the Queen's Bench Division to do the same regarding that division of the High Court. This allowed Lord Bingham to spend time hearing cases in both divisions as well as the Queen's Bench Divisional Court and the Crown Court. The current holder is Sir Timothy Holroyde.

Vice-presidents
 1997: Sir Christopher Rose
 24 April 2006: Sir David Latham
 February 2009: Sir Anthony Hughes
 2013: Heather Hallett, Baroness Hallett
 October 2019 Sir Adrian Fulford
 October 2022 Sir Timothy Holroyde

References

Court of Appeal (England and Wales)